Martin Kronlund (1916 – March 2008) was a fencing trainer at the School of Physical Activity and Sport Sciences of the Technical University of Madrid.

In 1971 he introduced the sport of orienteering into Spain as part of the physical training of his students. The Spanish orienteering club ADYRON organises the annual orienteering event named Trofeo Martin Kronlund.

References

External links
 El maestro de armas Martin Kronlund fallece a los 91 años, Europa Press, March 3, 2008
 Deporte de orientación

Academic staff of the Technical University of Madrid
Orienteering innovators
1916 births
2008 deaths